Healthcare in New York (state) refers to all health care available in the state of New York.

New York State Department of Health
The New York State Department of Health manages state government projects in New York. The current development plan for state government action in New York is the Prevention Agenda 2013-2017.

The health insurance marketplace for New York is NY State of Health.

Hospitals in New York

The American Hospital Directory lists 261 active hospitals in New York State in 2022.  Two hundred and ten of these hospitals have staffed-beds with a total of 64,515 beds.  The largest number of hospitals are in New York City.  The January 1, 2022 listing by the New York Health Department of general hospitals covered by the New York Healthcare Reform Act show 165 hospitals 63 closed hospitals, and 51 hospitals that had been merged with other hospitals.

The oldest hospital in New York State and also oldest hospital in the United States is the Bellevue Hospital in Manhattan, established in 1736.  The hospital with the largest number of staffed beds is the NewYork-Presbyterian Hospital in Manhattan with 2,678 beds in its hospital complex.

Healthcare by region

New York City

New York City is the largest city in the United States and offers all available health care services.

Buffalo, New York

Buffalo is the second largest city in the State of New York.

References

Further reading

See also
 COVID-19 pandemic in New York (state)

External links
New York State Department of Health